Primo Higa (born 11 March 1973) is a retired middle distance athlete from the Solomon Islands.

Higa represented the Solomon Islands in two Olympics, in the 1996 Summer Olympics which was held in Atlanta he didn't finish the 3000 metres steeplechase, then four years later at the 2000 Summer Olympics held in Sydney he finished 13th in his heat in the 3000 metres steeplechase but didn't advance to the final.

References

External links
 

1973 births
Living people
Solomon Islands male middle-distance runners
Solomon Islands steeplechase runners
Athletes (track and field) at the 1996 Summer Olympics
Athletes (track and field) at the 2000 Summer Olympics
Olympic athletes of the Solomon Islands